The Department of Justice and Community Safety (DJCS) is one of nine government departments in the state of Victoria, Australia.

Known as the Department of Justice and Regulation until January 2019, it manages and provides government services relating to Victoria's justice system.

Ministers
, the DJCS supports four ministers in the following portfolios:

Functions
The DJCS has responsibility for the following policy areas:
 Legal system
 Courts and tribunals
 Policing
 Business licensing 
 Corrections, prisons and parole
 Human rights and anti-discrimination law
 Emergency services
 Births, deaths and marriages 
 Emergency management
 Consumer affairs
 Workplace safety
 Gambling and alcohol regulation

Agencies
Agencies under the DJCS portfolios include:

References

External links 
 

Justice
Victoria